V5668 Sagittarii, also known as Nova Sagittarii 2015 Number 2 was the second and brighter of two novae in the southern constellation of Sagittarius in 2015 (the first was V5667 Sagittarii, reported on 12 February 2015). It was discovered by John  of Chatsworth Island, New South Wales, Australia on 15 March 2015 with a DSLR patrol camera.   At the time of discovery it was a 6th magnitude star. It peaked at magnitude of 4.32 on March 21, 2015, making it easily visible to the naked eye. 

V5668 Sagittarii's peak brightness was followed by a series of fluctuations in brightness, then a strong decline of 7 magnitudes during June as the nova went through a dust formation phase. The light curve for this event is very similar to the DQ Herculis intermediate polar, and it shows a coincident oscillation in X-ray flux with a period of  due to rotation of the white dwarf. The white dwarf and its companion star are surrounded by a dusty shell of ejected material.

In 2016 Banerjee et al. showed that 107 days after the nova outburst, its dust-dominated SED was well approximated by an 850 K blackbody spectrum. That temperature, along with infrared flux measurements, allowed them to calculate the mass of the dust shell to be , and the mass of the entire shell to be .  The angular diameter of the dust shell was estimated to be 42 milliarcsec which, along with the time since outburst and the measured expansion velocity of 530 km/sec, allowed the distance, to be calculated. 

Two and a half years after the nova event, the ALMA array, operating in the 230 GHz mm-wave radio band, observed a clumpy, roughly circular nova remnant surrounding V5668 Sagittarii.   It was about one half arc second in diameter at that time, and was well resolved by the interferometer.

References

Further reading

Novae
Intermediate polars
Sagittarius (constellation)
20150315
Sagittarii, V5668